Harley Ingleby is an Australian professional longboard surfrider.

Ingleby finished 5th in his first year competing in the 2005 ASP World Tour. In 2008, he won Oxbow world tour event in Anglet, France finishing 3rd overall in points. He won his first Asp World Longboard Championship title in 2009 and reclaimed the title in 2014 at Hainan Island, China. He is also two-time Australian longboard champion (2005, 2007) and he won the Australian Longboard Open in 2013 & 2017.

In April 2019 Ingleby was cast of mini-series Like You Mean It produced by Ford, appearing together with DJ Tigerlily, podcaster and motivational speaker Matt Purcell, and Australian model and Muay Thai fighter Lilian Dikmans.

References

External links
 Website
 

Living people
People from Coffs Harbour
Sportsmen from New South Wales
Australian surfers
World Surf League surfers
Year of birth missing (living people)